Reform Girl is a 1933 American crime drama film directed by Sam Newfield and starring Noel Francis, Richard 'Skeets' Gallagher and Hale Hamilton. Shortly after being released from reform school, a young woman is recruited as the long lost daughter of a prominent Senator as part of an attempt to discredit him.

Cast
 Noel Francis as Lydia Johnson 
 Richard 'Skeets' Gallagher as Joe Burke 
 Hale Hamilton as Santor Putnam 
 Robert Ellis as Kellar 
 Dorothy Peterson as Mrs. Putnam 
 Stanley Smith as David Carter 
 Ben Hendricks Jr. as Rafferty 
 DeWitt Jennings as Capt. Balfour 
 Mary Foy  as Prison Matron 
 Broderick O'Farrell as Putnam Associate 
 Alexander Pollard as Putnam's Butler
 Larry Steers as Putnam Associate

References

Bibliography
 Pitts, Michael R. Poverty Row Studios, 1929–1940: An Illustrated History of 55 Independent Film Companies, with a Filmography for Each. McFarland & Company, 2005.

External links
 

1933 films
1933 crime drama films
1930s English-language films
American crime drama films
Films directed by Sam Newfield
American black-and-white films
1930s American films